Hemerocallis lilioasphodelus (syn. Hemerocallis flava, known as lemon daylily, lemon lily, yellow daylily, and other names) is a plant of the genus Hemerocallis. It is found across China, in Europe in N.E. Italy and Slovenia and is one of the first daylilies used for breeding new daylily cultivars.

Hemerocallis lilioasphodelus grows in big, spreading clumps, and its leaves grow to 75 cm (30 in) long. Its scapes each bear from 3 through 9 sweetly fragrant, lemon-yellow flowers.

Culinary use
The flowers of some daylillies, including Hemerocallis lilioasphodelus are edible and are used in Chinese cuisine and Japanese cuisine.

Gallery

References

lilioasphodelus
Flora of Asia
Garden plants
Edible plants